Nicholas Hill (also Nichaolas Hyll, Montanus or van de bergh) was a native of the Low Countries who came to England in 1519 and took out letters of denization in 1544. In 1546 the first book with his name in the imprint was issued, and between then and 1553 he printed twenty-three books, mostly for other people. He appears to have done no retail trade as a bookseller and this is probably the reason his house had no sign. He died about 1553.

One of the earliest books containing copperplate engravings produced in England was printed by Hill in 1553: Thomas Gemini's Compendiosa totius anatomie delineatio, aere exarata. The plates are supposed to have been some of the first rolling press work done in England. Thirty-eight of the forty plates are copies from Vesalius' De humani corporis fabrica (Basle, 1543), and the remaining two from his Epitome of the same date. The text is similar to that used by Thomas Vicary in his Anatomie of the bodie of man (1548) but rearranged. The book also contains the only English translation of the descriptions of the drawings in the Fabrica. The translation and arrangement of the text was the work of the dramatist Nicholas Udall.

External links

1550s deaths
16th-century printers
Year of birth unknown
16th-century English people